"I Feel for You" is a song written by American musician Prince that originally appeared on his 1979 self-titled album. The most successful and best-known version was recorded by R&B singer Chaka Khan and appeared on her 1984 album of the same name. It became the recipient of two Grammy Awards for Best R&B Song (with Prince as its songwriter) and Best Female R&B Vocal Performance for Khan.

Background and other versions
Prince originally wrote "I Feel For You" and his hit single "I Wanna Be Your Lover" for musician Patrice Rushen, but she turned down both songs. Prince subsequently recorded them for his eponymous second album, which was released in October 1979. For the song, Prince uses a falsetto vocal with the melody range between C3 and D5. 

The Pointer Sisters recorded the song in 1982 on their album So Excited!, and Rebbie Jackson recorded it for her 1984 debut album Centipede. In 1993, Britney Spears and Justin Timberlake sang this song on The Mickey Mouse Club.

In October 2019, in honor of the 40th anniversary of the album Prince, the Prince Estate and Warner Records released a previously unheard solo acoustic demo recording of the song, with Prince also performing acoustic guitar. The track became available on streaming services and as a limited-run 7” vinyl single which sold out.

Chaka Khan version

Chaka Khan's version of "I Feel for You" featured a supporting cast including rapping from Melle Mel (of Grandmaster Flash and the Furious Five); guitar, drum programming, bass guitar, keyboards and arrangement by Reggie Griffin; bass synthesizer and programming by The System's David Frank using an Oberheim DSX sequencer, which was connected to his Minimoog via CV and gate; and chromatic harmonica playing by Stevie Wonder. The song also uses vocal samples from Wonder's song "Fingertips" (1963). The repetition of Khan's name by Melle Mel at the beginning of the song was a mistake made by producer Arif Mardin, who then decided to keep it.

This version of the song sold more than one million copies in the US and UK, and it helped to relaunch Khan's career. The song hit No. 1 on the Cash Box singles chart and peaked at No. 3 on the Billboard Hot 100 chart from the weeks of November 24, 1984 to December 8, 1984, prevented by further chart movement by Prince's "Purple Rain" and Wham!'s massive hit "Wake Me Up Before You Go Go". The song remained on the Billboard Hot 100 for 26 weeks and became one of Billboards five biggest pop songs of the year for 1985. The single reached No. 1 on both the US dance and R&B charts in late 1984, remaining atop both for three weeks each. In addition, the song also reached No. 1 on the UK Singles Chart, remaining there for three weeks from November 4–25, 1984. While touring with Prince in 1998 in support of her collaborative album, Come 2 My House, Khan and Prince performed "I Feel for You" as a duet.

Khan's version of the song is written in the key of G major with a tempo of 125 beats per minute in common time.  Khan's vocals span from D4 to A5 in the song.

Personnel
 Chaka Khan – lead vocals, backing vocals
 Steve Ferrone – drums
 David Frank – keyboards, synthesizer, programming
 Philippe Saisse – keyboards, synthesizer, programming
 Robbie Buchanan – keyboards, synthesizer, programming
 Reggie Griffin – guitar, bass, keyboards, synthesizer, drum machine, programming and arrangement
 Stevie Wonder –  chromatic harmonica
 Grandmaster Melle Mel – vocals
Mark Williamson - vocals

Music video
The first version of the music video for Khan's song featured her working in a club with female dancers. As rap music and breakdancing were gaining popularity in mainstream pop culture at the time, the song was released and proved a success, so another version of the video, in an inner-city courtyard setting, was created. 

Director Jane Simpson—who had graduated from UCLA's film school and worked in animation before moving to work on commercials—was brought in as the director for what would be her first music video. Simpson and the production company who produced Chaka Khan’s video for the track had already been working on a video combining some of the early 1980s day-glo fashions with break dancing and rap. Simpson had already approached several designers who had rejected her concept before Norma Kamali agreed to let her clothing designs appear in the video, which was originally titled “Street Beat”, and shot in a studio mocked-up to look like the multi-racial hip hop club Radio-Tron in the MacArthur Park area in L.A. The choreographer was Joanne DiVito; break dancers appearing in the footage were Shabba Doo, Boogaloo Shrimp, Bruno "Pop N Taco" Falcon and Ana "Lollipop" Sánchez, all of whom also appeared in the movie Breakin'. To this pre-shot footage was added new footage of Chaka Khan and deejay Chris "The Glove" Taylor spinning a hot pink-colored 12-inch single with “Chaka” printed on the label, as well as Khan standing near a chain-link fence and other props, including graffiti-covered panels, on a studio soundstage.

A remixed version of the video was later created to match the 12" vinyl version of the single.

Charts

Weekly charts

Year-end charts

Certifications and sales

See also
List of number-one dance hits (United States)

References

1979 songs
1984 singles
Prince (musician) songs
Chaka Khan songs
The Pointer Sisters songs
Songs written by Prince (musician)
Cashbox number-one singles
UK Singles Chart number-one singles
Song recordings produced by Prince (musician)
Warner Records singles
Dance-pop songs